Charles Hill & Sons was a major shipbuilder based in Bristol, England, during the 19th and 20th centuries.

Background

Established in 1845 from the company Hilhouse, they specialised mainly in merchant and commercial ships, but also undertook the building of warships and governmental vessels especially during the First and Second World Wars.

The company became Charles Hill and Sons after shipwright Charles Hill, who joined the original shipbuilder in 1824, acquired and renamed the firm in 1845.

In 1879 they established Bristol City Line, a transatlantic service between Bristol and New York (BCL ceased operations after 1974). In 1881 the company built its first iron ship, and then moved into steel sailing vessels.

A tugboat built by Charles Hill & Sons, is now a tourist attraction - having been scuttled off the coast of Malta, it is now a sports scuba diving destination.

During World War 2, eight Flower-class corvettes and seven River-class frigates were built at the yard for the Royal Navy. 

The company went out of business in 1977 and the dockyard is now owned by Abels Shipbuilders since 1980.

References

Defunct shipbuilding companies of the United Kingdom
Defunct companies based in Bristol
Manufacturing companies based in Bristol
Manufacturing companies established in 1845
Manufacturing companies disestablished in 1977